Jowrka Sar (also Romanized as Jowrkā Sar; also known as Jorkā Sar) is a village in Amlash-e Jonubi Rural District, in the Central District of Amlash County, Gilan Province, Iran. At the 2006 census, its population was 386, in 101 families.

References 

Populated places in Amlash County